Rhinocladiella mackenziei is a deeply pigmented fungus that is a common cause of human cerebral phaeohyphomycosis. Rhinocladiella mackenziei was believed to be endemic solely to the Middle East, due to the first cases of infection being limited to the region. However, cases of R. mackenziei infection are increasingly reported from regions outside the Middle East. This pathogen is unique in that the majority of cases have been reported from immunologically normal people.

History 
Rhinocladiella mackenziei was first identified in 1993 as Ramichloridium mackenziei by C.K. Campbell & Al-Hedaithy when it was identified as the cause of eight cases of human cerebral phaeohyphomycosis. All eight patients had abscess formation and six of the patients had aspirated pus with branching hyphae. Campbell and Al-Hedaithy considered different genera for the un-named fungus, including Zasmidium, Leptodontidium, Ramichloridium, and Rhinocladiella. They elected to place it in the genus Ramichloridium based on morphological similarity. In previous publications, Naim-Ur-Rahman misidentified the fungus in the genus Cladosporium, while Al-Hedaithy et al (1988) considered it synonymous with Fonsecaea pedrosoi.

The genus Ramichloridium encompasses asexual species that produce upright, darkly pigmented, apically elongating, zig-zag-shaped conidiophores that produce single-celled conidia. It was first described in 1937 by Stahel as Ramichloridium musae but the genus was considered invalid as Stahel's publication lacked a Latin diagnosis. The genus Ramichloridium was re-introduced by de Hoog in 1977 typified by R. apiculatum.

Rhinocladiella mackenziei was treated in the genus Ramichloridium until Arzanlou and coworkers explored the phylogeny of Ramichloridium and its related genera through partial sequences of the 28S (LSU) rRNA gene and the ITS region.  The fungus was found to cluster in the Chaetothyriales clade along with Rhinocladiella species and was subsequently transferred to the genus Rhinocladiella. One of the main features that helped distinguish Ramichloridium and Rhinocladiella is the presence of Exophiala-like budding cells in Rhinocladiella, which were also seen in R. mackenziei. Additionally, the conidiophores of R. mackenziei resemble undifferentiated from the vegetative hyphae in contrast to those in Ramichloridium that are differentiated.

Habitat and ecology 
Rhinocladiella mackenziei is found in the hot and arid climates of temperate and tropical regions. It is considered endemic throughout the Middle East, specifically Saudi Arabia, Kuwait, and Qatar, and infections by this species have been observed in individuals from Afghanistan, Iran, and India. It is known less commonly to inhabit temperate and tropical regions. The environmental niche of R. mackenziei remains unknown. Another fungus associated with causing cerebral phaeohyphomycosis; Cladophialophora bantiana, has been isolated in one occasion from sawdust, which could also be a possible source of R. mackenziei. Due to the lack of knowledge about its environmental niche, it has been difficult to isolate R. mackenziei; and selective techniques such as the use of high temperatures, mouse vectors, alkyl benzenes and mineral oils are required. Enrichment of growth media with volatile aromatic hydrocarbons improves recovery of this agent, implying a role for aromatic hydrocarbon degradation in its environmental niche.

Morphology and reproduction 
Rhinocladiella mackenziei is a black yeast-like fungus with holoblastic conidia (conidia that are produced by simple budding) that are broadly oval and more than 2μm wide. In vitro at 30 °C, R. mackenziei has smooth, pigmented, septate hyphae and narrower, pale brown aerial hyphae. Its conidiophores are undifferentiated or only slightly differentiated from vegetative hyphae, and produce brown, smooth-walled, oval conidia. Rhinocladiella mackenziei grows slowly in culture media. Colonies grown for a week at 30 °C on glucose peptone agar develop a dark grey-brown to black appearance with a black reverse, elevated center, and densely cottony texture. Rhinocladiella mackenziei grows poorly at 25 °C and is not to produce a sexual state.

Disease in humans 
Rhinocladiella mackenziei is a black yeast-like neurotropic fungus and one of the three main causative agents of cerebral phaeohyphomycosis. Histologically, infection by this agent causes the cerebrospinal fluid to become blackish and necrotic, pus-filled lesions to develop in brain tissue. R. mackenziei is mostly found in brain abscesses of immunocompetent patients, however infection has been reported in conjunction with Primary Central Nervous System Lymphoma (PCNSL). Infection by this agent is associated with extremely high mortality despite aggressive antifungal treatment and surgery. Symptoms may include headaches, fevers, neurological deficits, seizures, hemiparesis and even psychotic behavior. Infection is thought to result from exposure to conidia through inhalation, ingestion or through skin lesions. Diagnosis of cerebral phaeohyphomycosis by R. mackenziei is confirmed by the microscopic observation of pigmented fungal elements in affected tissues combined with the identification of the agent by culture or genetic sequencing. Central nervous system colonization is thought to be secondary to spread through blood and lymph tissue. The basis for the affinity of R. mackenziei for brain tissue is unknown but has been hypothesized to involve the fungal melanin which acts as a virulence factor by allowing it to evade a human host's immune system and cross the blood-brain barrier. Melanin also protects the fungal cell wall from hydrolysis by scavenging  the free radicals and hypochlorite produced by the immune system as well as helping to prevent antifungal drugs from entering the fungal pathogen.

Treatment 
Untreated cerebral phaeohyphomycosis  caused by Rhinocladiella mackenziei has a mortality rate of nearly 100%, although some case reports exist of documented survival of patients.  Rhinocladiella mackenziei has been shown to be resistant to Amphotericin B, an antifungal drug commonly used to treat fungal infections, both in vivo and in vitro. Susceptibility to triazoles such as itraconazole, posaconazole and isavuconazole has been seen in 10 strains of R. mackenziei, though a mixture of amphotericin B, itraconazole and 5-flucytosine has been associated with poor outcome in animal and clinical studies. Approaches to disease management typically involve combined antifungal chemotherapy (combination therapy), surgical debridement and immunotherapy.

References 

Eurotiomycetes
Animal fungal diseases
Fungi described in 1993